In mechanical engineering, Yoshimura buckling is a triangular mesh buckling pattern found in thin-walled cylinders under compression along the axis of the cylinder, producing a corrugated shape resembling the Schwarz lantern. The same pattern can be seen on the sleeves of Mona Lisa.

This buckling pattern is named after Yoshimaru Yoshimura (吉村慶丸), the Japanese researcher who provided an explanation for its development in a paper first published in Japan in 1951, and later republished in the United States in 1955. Unknown to Yoshimura, the same phenomenon had previously been studied by Theodore von Kármán and Qian Xuesen in 1941.

The crease pattern for folding the Schwarz lantern from a flat piece of paper, a tessellation of the plane by isosceles triangles, has also been called the Yoshimura pattern based on the same work by Yoshimura. The Yoshimura creasing pattern is related to both the Kresling and Hexagonal folds, and can be framed as a special case of the Miura fold. Unlike the Miura fold which is rigidly deformable, both the Yoshimura and Kresling patterns require panel deformation to be folded to a compact state.

References 

Mechanical failure modes
Structural analysis
Paper folding
Mechanics
Mona Lisa